Jaume Munar was the defending champion but chose not to defend his title.

Dmitry Popko won the title after defeating Andrea Pellegrino 6–2, 6–4 in the final.

Seeds

Draw

Finals

Top half

Bottom half

References

External links
Main draw
Qualifying draw

Lisboa Belém Open - 1
2021 Men's Singles